Juan Tomás Martínez Gutierrez (born 16 July 1962 in Barakaldo) is a Spanish former professional road cyclist.

Major results

1985
 3rd Subida a Arrate
 10th Clásica de San Sebastián
1986
 2nd Overall Vuelta a los Valles Mineros
1st Stage 2a
1987
 8th Overall Euskal Bizikleta
1988
 3rd Overall Vuelta a Murcia
 9th Overall Euskal Bizikleta
1989
 4th Overall Vuelta a Andalucía
 4th Overall Euskal Bizikleta
 6th Overall Setmana Catalana de Ciclisme
 7th Subida al Naranco
 9th Clásica de San Sebastián
1990
 4th Road race, National Road Championships
1994
 6th Subida a Urkiola

Grand Tour general classification results timeline

References

External links

1962 births
Living people
Spanish male cyclists
Cyclists from the Basque Country (autonomous community)
Sportspeople from Barakaldo